In Colorado, State Highway 164 may refer to:
U.S. Route 164 in Colorado, now part of US 160
Colorado State Highway 164 (1930s) south of Glenwood Springs
Colorado State Highway 164 (pre-1953) northwest of Colorado Springs